Christoph Deutschmann (born 15 November 1946 in Stuttgart) is a German sociologist. He currently holds a professorship at the University of Tübingen.

Deutschmann studied sociology as a major, with economics and law as minors, at the Goethe University of Frankfurt am Main, graduating (German Diplom) in 1973 and earning his PhD (German Dr.) there in 1975. From 1976 to 1984, he worked as a research assistant at the Institute for Social Research, home of the Frankfurt School and Critical Theory. In 1987, he habilitated in the Social Sciences at Goethe University Frankfurt. Since 1989, he is professor for Social and Behavioural Sciences in Tübingen.

His research is mainly in the field of economic sociology, dealing with the role of money in modernization and for the affluent society; he criticizes money as being the new religion of the secular and capitalist society. Deutschmann is a proponent of Keynesianism suggests to overcome growth imperatives.

References
 

1946 births
Living people
Degrowth advocates
German sociologists
Goethe University Frankfurt alumni
German economists
German male non-fiction writers